During the 1998–99 English football season, Nottingham Forest F.C. competed in the FA Premier League.

Season summary
Nottingham Forest's campaign back in the Premiership got off to a fairly good start in the first three games in the season, losing narrowly 2-1 at Arsenal and winning the other two against Coventry City and at Southampton; however, it would be 19 games until their next victory and they went on a very poor run of only one win in 25 league games - in addition to two wins in 32 games - and winning their final three games did not matter as they were already relegated. Pierre Van Hooijdonk, top scorer in Forest's promotion-winning 1997-98 campaign, went AWOL before the start of the season following the sale of strike partner Kevin Campbell and it appeared that he would never play for the club again. He returned in October, but Forest were already deep in relegation trouble and it was too late to save manager Dave Bassett's job. Ron Atkinson made what appeared to be his final return to management, but was unable to save Forest from relegation in bottom place - the third time in seven years that they had endured this fate. With just 7 wins and 30 points all season, they had never really looked like beating the drop, due to embarrassing results like the 1-8 defeat at home to Manchester United. A win at Goodison Park was the highlight of Atkinson's ill-fated tenure, along with a three-match running win at the end of the season (albeit after they had already been relegated) that at least saw them avoid going down with the lowest points total since the formation of the Premier League. This marked the first instance since the 1927-28 season that the winner of England's second tier finished bottom in their subsequent season in the top-flight.

When Atkinson's contract was not renewed, Brian Little, Glenn Hoddle and Roy Evans were just some of the many high profile names linked with the manager's job, but in the end it was 33-year-old former England captain David Platt who took on the role as player-manager.

Final league table

Results summary

Results by round

Results
Nottingham Forest's score comes first

Legend

FA Premier League

FA Cup

League Cup

First-team squad
Squad at end of season

Left club during season

Reserve squad

Statistics

Appearances, goals and cards
(Starting appearances + substitute appearances)

Starting 11
Considering starts in all competitions
 GK: #1,  Dave Beasant, 30
 RB: #17,  Thierry Bonalair, 27
 CB: #15,  Craig Armstrong, 24
 CB: #5,  Steve Chettle, 36
 LB: #3,  Alan Rogers, 38
 RM: #7,  Steve Stone, 30
 CM: #11,  Chris Bart-Williams, 23
 CM: #10,  Andy Johnson, 28
 LM: #8,  Scot Gemmill, 21
 CF: #14,  Dougie Freedman, 25
 CF: #40,  Pierre van Hooijdonk, 19

Transfers

In

Out

Transfers in:  £6,550,000
Transfers out:  £12,145,000
Total spending:  £5,595,000

Staff

References

Nottingham Forest F.C. seasons
Nottingham Forest